Commodores is an American funk and soul band, which was at its peak in the late 1970s through the mid 1980s. The members of the group met as mostly freshmen at Tuskegee Institute (now Tuskegee University) in 1968, and signed with Motown in November 1972, having first caught the public eye opening for the Jackson 5 while on tour.

The group's most successful period was in the late 1970s and early 1980s when Lionel Richie was the co-lead singer. The band's biggest hit singles are ballads such as "Easy", "Three Times a Lady", and "Nightshift"; and funk-influenced dance songs; including "Brick House", "Fancy Dancer", "Lady (You Bring Me Up)", and "Too Hot ta Trot". 

Commodores were inducted into the Alabama Music Hall of Fame and Vocal Group Hall of Fame. The band has also won one Grammy Award out of nine nominations. The Commodores have sold over 70 million albums worldwide.

History
Commodores were formed from two former student groups, the Mystics and the Jays. Richie described some members of the Mystics as "jazz buffs".
The new six-man band featured Lionel Richie, Thomas McClary, and William King from the Mystics, and Andre Callahan, Michael Gilbert, and Milan Williams from the Jays. To choose their name, William King opened a dictionary and randomly picked a word. "We lucked in," he remarked with a laugh when telling this story to People magazine. "We almost became 'The Commodes.'"

The bandmembers attended Tuskegee University in Alabama. After winning the university's annual freshman talent contest, they played at fraternity parties as well as a weekend gig at the Black Forest Inn, one of a few clubs in Tuskegee that catered to college students. They performed cover tunes and some original songs with their first singer, James Ingram (not the famous solo artist). Ingram, older than the rest of the band, left to serve in Vietnam, and was later replaced by drummer Walter "Clyde" Orange, who wrote or co-wrote many of their hits. Lionel Richie and Orange alternated as lead singers. Orange was the lead singer on the Top 10 hits "Brick House" (1977) and "Nightshift" (1985).

The early band was managed by Benny Ashburn, who brought them to his family's vacation lodge on Martha's Vineyard in 1971 and 1972. There, Ashburn test-marketed the group by having them play in parking lots and summer festivals.

"Machine Gun" (1974), the instrumental title track from the band's debut album, became a staple at American sporting events, and is also heard in many films, including Boogie Nights and Looking for Mr. Goodbar. It reached No. 22 on the Billboard Hot 100 in 1974. Another 1974 song "I Feel Sanctified" has been called a "prototype" of Wild Cherry's 1976 big hit "Play That Funky Music". Three albums released in 1975 and 1976, Caught in the Act was funk album, but Movin' On and Hot on the Tracks were pop albums. After those recordings the group developed the mellower sound hinted at in their 1976 top-ten hits, "Sweet Love" and "Just to Be Close to You".  In 1977, the Commodores released "Easy", which became the group's biggest hit yet, reaching No. 4 in the US, followed by funky single "Brick House", also top 5, both from their album Commodores, as was "Zoom".  The group reached No. 1 in 1978 with "Three Times a Lady".  In 1979, the Commodores scored another top-five ballad, "Sail On", before reaching the top of the charts once again with another ballad, "Still". In 1981 they released two top-ten hits with "Oh No" (No. 4) and their first upbeat single in almost five years, "Lady (You Bring Me Up)" (No. 8).

Commodores made a brief appearance in the 1978 film, Thank God It's Friday. They performed the song "Too Hot ta Trot" during the dance contest; the songs "Brick House" and "Easy" were also played in the movie

In 1982, Lionel Richie left to pursue a solo career, and Skyler Jett replaced him as co-lead singer.  Also in 1982, their manager Benjamin Ashburn died of a heart attack at the age of 54.

Founding member McClary left in 1984 (shortly after Richie) to pursue a solo career, and to develop a gospel music company.  McClary was replaced by guitarist-vocalist Sheldon Reynolds. Then LaPread left in 1986 and moved to Auckland, New Zealand.  Reynolds departed for Earth, Wind & Fire in 1987, which prompted trumpeter William "WAK" King to take over primary guitar duties for live performances.  Keyboardist Milan Williams exited the band in 1989 after allegedly refusing to tour South Africa.

The group gradually abandoned its funk roots and moved into the more commercial pop arena. In 1984, former Heatwave singer James Dean "J.D." Nicholas assumed co-lead vocal duties with drummer Walter Orange. That line-up was hitless until 1985 when their final Motown album Nightshift, produced by Dennis Lambert (prior albums were produced by James Anthony Carmichael), delivered the title track "Nightshift", a loving tribute to Marvin Gaye and Jackie Wilson, both of whom had died the previous year. "Nightshift" hit no. 3 in the US and won the Commodores their first Grammy for Best R&B Performance by a Duo or Group With Vocals in 1985.

In 2010 a new version was recorded, dedicated to Michael Jackson. The Commodores were on a European tour performing at Wembley Arena, London, on June 25, 2009, when they walked off the stage after they were told that Michael Jackson had died. Initially the band thought it was a hoax. However, back in their dressing rooms they received confirmation and broke down in tears. The next night at Birmingham's NIA Arena, J.D. Nicholas added Jackson's name to the lyrics of the song, and henceforth the Commodores have mentioned Jackson and other deceased R&B singers. Thus came the inspiration upon the one-year anniversary of Jackson's death to re-record, with new lyrics, the hit song "Nightshift" as a tribute.

In 1990, they formed Commodores Records and re-recorded their 20 greatest hits as Commodores Hits Vol. I & II. They have recorded a live album, Commodores Live, along with a DVD of the same name, and a Christmas album titled Commodores Christmas. In 2012, the band was working on new material, with some contributions written by current and former members.

Commodores as of 2020 consist of Walter "Clyde" Orange, James Dean "J.D." Nicholas, and William "WAK" King, along with their five-piece band The Mean Machine.  They continue to perform, playing at arenas, theaters, and festivals around the world.

Personnel
Current members
 William "WAK" King – trumpet, guitar, keyboards, vocals (1968–present)
 Walter Orange – drums, vocals (1972–present)
 James Dean "J.D." Nicholas – vocals, keyboards (1984–present)
 Mario Ortiz - Keyboards (2022-present)

Former members
 Lionel Richie – vocals, keyboards, saxophone (1968–82)
 Milan Williams – keyboards, rhythm guitar (1968–89)
 Thomas McClary – lead guitar, vocals (1968–83)
 Andre Callahan – drums, vocals, keyboards (1968–70)
 Michael Gilbert – bass guitar, trumpet (1968–70) 
 Eugene Ward – keyboards (1968–70)
 Ronald LaPread – bass guitar (1970–86)
 James Ingram – vocals, drums (1970–72)
 Skyler Jett – vocals, keyboards (1982–84)
 Sheldon Reynolds – lead guitar (1983–87)
 Mikael Manley – lead guitar (1995–2005)

Timeline

Discography

Studio albums
 Machine Gun  (1974)
 Caught in the Act (1975)
 Movin' On (1975)
 Hot on the Tracks (1976)
 Commodores (1977)
 Natural High  (1978)
 Midnight Magic (1979)
 Heroes (1980)
 In the Pocket (1981)
 Commodores 13 (1983)
 Nightshift  (1985)
 United (1986)
 Rock Solid (1988)
 No Tricks (1993)

Accolades

Grammy awards
The Commodores have won one Grammy Award out of ten nominations.

Alabama Music Hall of Fame
During 1995 the Commodores were inducted into the Alabama Music Hall of Fame.

Vocal Group Hall of Fame
During 2003 the Commodores were also inducted into the Vocal Group Hall of Fame.

References

External links
 Official Commodores website
 Lionel Richie interview by Pete Lewis, 'Blues & Soul' 03/2009
 'The Commodores' Vocal Group Hall of Fame Page

 
American dance music groups
American funk musical groups
American soul musical groups
Motown artists
Musical groups from Alabama
Grammy Award winners
Musical groups established in 1968
Tuskegee University alumni
Lionel Richie
African-American musical groups
Universal Motown Records artists
1968 establishments in Alabama